The 2016 United States presidential election in Iowa was held on Tuesday, November 8, 2016, as part of the 2016 United States presidential election in which all 50 states plus the District of Columbia participated. Iowa voters chose electors to represent them in the Electoral College via a popular vote, pitting the Republican Party's nominee, businessman Donald Trump, and running mate Indiana Governor Mike Pence against Democratic Party nominee, former Secretary of State Hillary Clinton, and her running mate Virginia Senator Tim Kaine. Iowa has six electoral votes in the Electoral College.

Trump won the state with 51.2% of the vote, while Clinton received 41.7%. Clinton's performance in Iowa was the worst performance for a Democratic presidential candidate since 1980. Trump won over a dozen counties that had not voted Republican since Ronald Reagan was on the ticket; won two counties that had last voted Republican in Richard Nixon's landslide victory in 1972; and also won Dubuque County, that had last voted Republican in 1956. Trump carried Iowa by the largest margin of any Republican candidate since Reagan in 1980, and he was the first Republican to win more than 50% of the popular vote since Reagan's 1984 landslide. Trump enjoyed the support of working-class whites in the agricultural industry, as well as the endorsement of Iowa's GOP establishment.

The difference of 9.4% points was the largest winning margin for Trump in a state that had voted for Barack Obama in 2012. This was also the first time since 1976 that Iowa voted to the right of Texas, which Trump won in this election by 8.99 points. Trump carried 93 out of 99 counties, the most for a Republican presidential nominee in the state since 1980, and he flipped 32 counties won by Obama in 2012, the most out of any state. This was the first time since 1988 in which Iowa did not go for the winner of the popular vote. It was also the first time since 2004 (and only the second since 1984) that Iowa would vote for a Republican candidate.

Caucuses

The incumbent President of the United States, Barack Obama, a Democrat and former U.S. Senator from Illinois, was first elected to the presidency in 2008, running with U.S. Senator Joe Biden of Delaware. Defeating the Republican nominee, Senator John McCain of Arizona, with 52.9% of the popular vote and 68% of the electoral vote, Obama succeeded two-term Republican President George W. Bush, the former Governor of Texas. Obama and Biden were reelected in the 2012 presidential election, defeating former Massachusetts Governor Mitt Romney with 51.1% of the popular vote and 61.7% of electoral votes. Although Barack Obama's approval rating in the RealClearPolitics poll tracking average remained between 40 and 50 percent for most of his second term, it experienced a surge in early 2016 and reached its highest point since 2012 during June of that year. Analyst Nate Cohn noted that a strong approval rating for President Obama would equate to a strong performance for the Democratic candidate, and vice versa.

President Obama was not eligible to be re-elected after having served two terms. Obama's running-mate and two-term Vice President Biden decided not to enter the race for the Democratic presidential nomination either.

Democratic caucus

Procedure

There is no ballot; instead, a unique form of debate and groupings chose delegates to county conventions supporting Hillary Clinton, Martin O'Malley, and Bernie Sanders. The Iowa Democratic Party does not release vote counts or the numbers of these delegates.

County Conventions
In early March, the delegates chosen in the Caucuses met chose delegates to the Congressional District Conventions.

Republican caucus

General election

Polling

Up until late August 2016, the election was close, with both Donald Trump and Hillary Clinton winning polls but neither taking a serious lead. In September 2016, Trump gained momentum, by winning a poll 44% to 39% in early September and then winning 3 more polls in a row by margins larger than 5%. From late September 2016 till election day, Trump won every poll but one. The final poll average showed Donald Trump ahead 44% to 41%, with many undecided voters that mostly swung to Donald Trump on election night. The latest poll also showed Trump ahead by 46% to 39%.

Predictions

Results

By county

Counties that flipped from Democratic to Republican

Allamakee (largest city: Waukon)
Boone (largest city: Boone)
Bremer (largest city: Waverly)
Buchanan (largest city: Independence)
Cedar (largest city: Tipton)
Cerro Gordo (largest city: Mason City)
Chickasaw (largest city: New Hampton)
Clarke (largest city: Osceola)
Clayton (largest city: Guttenberg)
Clinton (largest city: Clinton)
Des Moines (largest city: Burlington)
Dubuque (largest city: Dubuque)
Fayette (largest city: Oelwein)
Floyd (largest city: Charles City)
Howard (largest city: Cresco)
Jackson (largest city: Maquoketa)
Jasper (largest city: Newton)
Jefferson (largest city: Fairfield)
Jones (largest city: Anamosa)
Lee (largest city: Fort Madison)
Louisa (largest city: Wapello)
Marshall (largest city: Marshalltown)
Mitchell (largest city: Osage)
Muscatine (largest city: Muscatine)
Poweshiek (largest city: Grinnell)
Tama (largest city: Tama)
Union (largest city: Creston)
Wapello (largest city: Ottumwa)
Webster (largest city: Fort Dodge)
Winneshiek (largest city: Decorah)
Woodbury (largest city: Sioux City)
Worth (largest city: Northwood)

By congressional district
Trump won all 4 of the congressional districts, including one held by a Democrat.

See also
 United States presidential elections in Iowa
 2016 Democratic Party presidential debates and forums
 2016 Democratic Party presidential primaries
 2016 Republican Party presidential debates and forums
 2016 Republican Party presidential primaries
 United States presidential election

References

External links
 RNC 2016 Republican Nominating Process 
 Green papers for 2016 primaries, caucuses, and conventions

Iowa
2016
Presidential